is a Japanese voice actress from Saitama Prefecture. She is affiliated with the agency With Line.

Biography 
Sashide was born in Saitama Prefecture on September 20, 1998. Sashide's mother enjoyed anime, which influenced her daughter and naturally led to Sashide's dream to become an actress. She initially wanted to act in the theater, but after she was told her voice had changed she decided to go into voice acting instead.

After graduating from A&G Academy in 2016, and joined her current agency in April of that year. Sashide was cast as Emma Verde in Love Lives "Perfect Dream Project" idol group. Apart from Love Live!, her voice acting roles include Hana Shirosaki in Wataten!: An Angel Flew Down to Me and Mai Inose in Asteroid in Love.

Personal life 
As a child, Sashide's favorite anime were Soul Eater, Gurren Lagann and Fullmetal Alchemist. She also likes the idol groups Nogizaka46, Keyakizaka46 and Hello! Project.

Her skills include jazz dance, tap dance and playing piano. She often plays original songs that her older sister wrote.

Filmography

Anime 
 Scorching Ping Pong Girls (2016) as Female student 2
 Wataten!: An Angel Flew Down to Me (2019) as Hana Shirosaki
 Asteroid in Love (2020) as Mai Inose
 Love Live! Nijigasaki High School Idol Club (2020) as Emma Verde
 Kiratto Pri Chan (2020) as Eve Kagayaki
 Aharen-san wa Hakarenai (2022) as Futaba
 Love Live! Nijigasaki High School Idol Club 2nd Season (2022) as Emma Verde
 Beast Tamer (2022) as Luna

Anime films 
 Zunda Horizon (2017) as Ōedo Chanko
 Wataten!: An Angel Flew Down to Me: Precious Friends (2022) as Hana Shirosaki

Video games

2016 
 Gyakuten Othellonia as Fredricka
 Gekitotsu! Crash Fight as Marsha
 Chain Chronicles as Paula

2017 
 Ichi Banketsu Online as Orihime
 Tenka Hyakken -Zan- as Yamatorige Ichimonji
 Tokyo Clanpool as Shirokka
 Puyopuyo!! Quest as Yue and Mappera

2019 
 Love Live! School Idol Festival as Emma Verde
 Love Live! School Idol Festival All Stars as Emma Verde

2020 
 Dead or Alive Xtreme Venus Vacation as Tsukishi
 Duel Masters PLAY's as Cocco Lupiko
 Kiratto Pri☆Chan as Eve Kagayaki

2022 
 Takt Op. Destiny in the City of Crimson Melody as Twinkle Twinkle Little Star
 Azur Lane as Emanuele Pessagno
 Stella of The End as Filia

Other 
VR Idol Stars Project "Hop Step Sing!" as Niina Nijikawa
Onsen Musume as Kaoru Yuda

References

External links 
Official agency profile 

1998 births
Living people
Anime singers
Japanese video game actresses
Japanese voice actresses
Nijigasaki High School Idol Club members
Voice actresses from Saitama Prefecture
21st-century Japanese actresses
21st-century Japanese singers
21st-century Japanese women singers